Madeira Botanical Garden is a botanical garden in Funchal, Madeira, opened to the public in 1960. The area was previously part of an estate belonging to the family of William Reid, founder of Reid's Hotel.

Collections 
The garden is divided into six areas:

 Madeiran indigenous and endemic species
 arboretum (collection of trees and shrubs) 
 succulent plants
 agro-industrial plants
 medicinal and aromatic plants
 palm trees and cycads 

Arboretum is located in the north part of the Garden, succulent plants in centre-east, agro-industrial plants in the center, palm trees in the south. Remaining parts of the Garden are covered with flowers other flora species.

The gardens include a bird park (Louro Bird Park) and a three-room Natural History Museum. There is a collection of around 300 exotic birds, including Blue and Yellow Macaw, Cockatoo, Parrots and Lory in the exotic bird park.

See also
List of botanical gardens#Portugal
:Category:Flora of Madeira

References

External links 

 Convention on Biological Diversity data

1960 establishments in Portugal
Botanical gardens in Portugal
Tourist attractions in Madeira
Funchal